The 2000 Nicholls State Colonels football team represented Nicholls State University as a member of the Southland Football League during the 2000 NCAA Division I-AA football season. Led by second-year head Daryl Daye, the Colonels finished the season with an overall record of 1–10 and a mark of 0–7 in conference play, placing last out of eight teams in the Southland. Nicholls State played home games at John L. Guidry Stadium in Thibodaux, Louisiana.

In the spring of 2001,  forfeited two wins from the 2000 season, over Nicholls State and Troy State, because an ineligible player had participated for the Demons in those games. With the forfeit, the Colonels' record improved to 2–9 overall and 1–6 in conference play, moving Troy State into a tie with Northwestern State for seventh place in the Southland standings.

Schedule

References

Nicholls State
Nicholls Colonels football seasons
Nicholls State Colonels football